Ruffy Silverstein may refer to:

 Ruffy Silverstein (American wrestler) (1914–1980)
 Ruffy Silverstein (Canadian wrestler) (born 1972)